A list of Belgian bands and artists of all time periods. The bands and artists are either Belgian, of Belgian origin or contain Belgian members.



0-9 
2 Fabiola
2 Many DJ's
2 unlimited

A 
à;GRUMH...
ABN
Aborted
A Brand 
Adèle Colson
Absolute Body Control
Absynthe Minded
Salvatore Adamo
Admiral Freebee
Philippe Aerts 
Agathocles
Aka Moon
Aksak Maboul
Allez Allez
Amatorski
Amenra
Amorroma
Ancient Rites
Angèle
Arid
Arno
Arsenal
A Split-Second 
Astroline
Natacha Atlas
Axelle Red

B 
Emma Bale
Balthazar
Basto
Roberto Bellarosa
Bob Benny
Bernthøler
Gert Bettens
Sam Bettens
Betty Goes Green
The Black Box Revelation
CJ Bolland
Bony King
Boogie Belgique
André Brasseur 
The Breath Of Life
Jacques Brel
Tina Bride
Brussels Jazz Orchestra
Brutus (Belgian band) 
Buscemi

C 
Fabrizio Cassol
Philip Catherine
The Chakachas
Channel Zero
Ann Christy 
The Clement Peerens Explosition
Clouseau
Club Moral
Compact Disk Dummies
Confetti's
Corina
Coone

D 
Daan 
DAAU/Die Anarchistische Abendunterhaltung
Das Pop
Dead Hollywood Stars
Dead Man Ray
Mélanie De Biasio
Kris Defoort, Kris Defoort Quartet
Maarten Devoldere
De Mens
Josquin Desprez
Danny Devos
dEUS
Diablo Blvd
Tom Dice
Dive
Dimitri Vegas & Like Mike
Wim De Craene

E 
Elephant Power Dj
Elmore D
Enthroned
Ertebrekers
Eté 67
Evil Superstars
Ellie Delvaux

F 
Lara Fabian
Fixkes
Flatcat
Flat Earth Society
Fleddy Melculy
Freaky Age
Front 242

G 
Stéphane Galland
Ghinzu
Girls in Hawaii
The Go Find
Goose
Gotye
Gorki
Rocco Granata 
Greetings From Mercury 
Raymond van het Groenewoud
Gwyllion

H 
Hadise
Michel Hatzigeorgiou
The Hickey Underworld
't Hof van Commerce
The Honeymoon Killers
Hooverphonic
Steve Houben
Henri PFR

I 
The Immortals
Intergalactic Lovers
Irish Coffee
Ithilien

J 
Janez Detd
Bobby Jaspar
Chris Joris
Junior Jack

K 
K3
Kamagurka
Kid Montana
The Kids 
Sandra Kim
Klinik
Flip Kowlier
K's Choice

L 
Felix de Laet - known as Lost frequencies
Lady Linn
Philippe Lafontaine
Laïs
Lasgo
Isolde Lasoen
Orlandus Lassus
Viktor Lazlo
Lea Rue
Jo Leemans
Leki
Jo Lemaire
Lio
L’itch
Charles Loos
Lords of Acid
Nathalie Loriers, Brussels Jazz Orchestra
Lost Frequencies
Helmut Lotti
Lous and the Yakuza
De Lama's

M 
Maak's Spirit
Machiavel
Magnus
Marc Moulin
Michel Massot
Wim Mertens
Milk Inc.
Millionaire
Milow
Mindgames
Mint
Mintzkov

N 
Nacht und Nebel
Nailpin
The Names
Natalia
Louis Neefs
Nemo
The Neon Judgement
Netsky
Jef Neve
Noordkaap
Loïc Nottet
Novastar

O 
Laura Omloop
Oscar and the Wolf
Ostrogoth
Ozark Henry

P 
Mauro Pawlowski
The Pebbles
Belle Perez
An Pierlé
Placebo - frontman Brian Molko was born in Belgium
Plastic Bertrand - "Ça Plane pour Moi"
Praga Khan
Present
Puggy

R 
The Radios
Rafflesia
Pierre Rapsat
Hugo Raspoet
Raxola
Red Zebra
Regi
Django Reinhardt
Renaissance 
Revolting Cocks
Gabriel Ríos
Perry Rose
Kate Ryan
Roméo Elvis

S 
Sadi
Liliane Saint-Pierre
Samson & Gert
The Scabs
Bobbejaan Schoepen
School is Cool
Selah Sue
Tony Servi
Shameboy
Sharko
Siglo XX
Soeur Sourire
Sonar
The Sore Losers
Soulsister 
Soulwax
Spoil Engine
Stash
Starflam
Steak Number Eight
Stromae
Styrofoam
The Subs
Suicide Commando
SX
Sylver

T 
T99
Taste of Sugar
TC Matic
Team William 
Technotronic 
Telex
The Tellers
Laura Tesoro
Toots Thielemans
Tony Servi & Corina
Tourist LeMC
Triggerfinger
Will Tura

U 
Udo
Ulrikes Dream
Univers Zéro
Urban Trad
Urbanus

V 
Frank Vaganée 
Ian Van Dahl 
Wannes Van de Velde  
Pierre Van Dormael 
Jeroen Van Herzeele
Fred Van Hove 
Stan Van Samang
Zjef Vanuytsel
Vaya Con Dios
Venus
Peter Verhoyen
Willem Vermandere 
Erik Vermeulen
Johan Verminnen
Vive la Fête

W 
Wallace Collection
Warhaus
Whispering Sons
Will Z.
Trixie Whitley

X 
Xandee 
X!NK
X-Legged Sally

Y 
Ya Kid K
Yves V

Z 
Zap Mama
Zita Swoon
Zornik

References

Bands and artists
Belgian